Germarica is a genus of beetles in the family Buprestidae, containing the following species:

 Germarica blackburni Obenberger, 1923
 Germarica carteri Obenberger, 1923
 Germarica lilliputana (Thomson, 1879)

Note on the date: Although Blackburn's paper was "read" on 4 October, 1887, the journal in which the paper was contained was not published until 1888. The authority should therefore properly be "Blackburn 1888", as listed in Nomenclator Zoologicus.

References

Buprestidae genera